The Master's Seminary (TMS) is the graduate seminary division of The Master's University and Seminary and is located on the campus of Grace Community Church in Sun Valley, California. It is accredited by the WASC Senior College and University Commission (WSCUC).

History
The Master's Seminary was founded in the fall of 1986 under the leadership of John F. MacArthur. In the early 1990s, the seminary experienced substantial growth. In March 1998, the seminary completed construction of its own facility on the church campus. The 32,000 square foot building houses the seminary administrative and faculty offices, library, studio facilities, and smaller class and seminar rooms.

The Master's Seminary first received WASC accreditation in 1988. The seminary is organized around five degree programs: Master of Divinity (M.Div.), Master of Theology (Th.M.) (added in 1992), Doctor of Philosophy (Ph.D.) (added in 2000, originally as a Doctor of Theology), Doctor of Ministry (D.Min.) in Expository Preaching (added in 2004), and a Spanish-language Master of Biblical Ministry (added in 2017). The last four programs were added after a process of substantive change and subsequent WSCUC approval.

The Master's University (TMU) began as Los Angeles Baptist Theological Seminary in 1927. In 1959, the campus relocated to Newhall, CA. In the 1950s, an undergraduate program was developed. During the process of acquiring accreditation from WASC in the early 1970s, it was decided that the original seminary would separate and relocate (becoming Northwest Baptist Seminary in Tacoma, WA). The college remained and became Los Angeles Baptist College. After MacArthur became president of the college in 1985, the name of the school was changed to The Master's College. The central college campus remains in Newhall (now incorporated as the city of Santa Clarita, California), while TMS has been located on the church campus from its beginning.

Accreditation
The institution has been accredited by the Western Association of Schools and Colleges since 1975. In July 2018, The Master's University and Seminary was placed under probation by its accrediting institution, the Western Association of Schools and Colleges Senior College and University Commission (WSCUC), which was lifted  in November 2020. The next Accreditation Visit from WASC is scheduled for Spring 2026. The institution has remedied the perceived problems within the time frame prescribed by WASC. In June 2019,  MacArthur retired from serving as the president and transitioned into the role of chancellor emeritus, in keeping with an announcement made in October 2018.

Doctrine
Theologically, The Master's Seminary is conservative and fundamentalist, affirming biblical inerrancy, a Reformed view of soteriology, and a Dispensational, premillennial position in eschatology. They have a thorough doctrinal statement, which covers the major aspects of their beliefs in a systematic fashion. The belief system is incorporated in the instructional tenets of their programs, emphasizing intense study of the Biblical languages in preparation for expository preaching. In 2017, the seminary faculty worked with John F. MacArthur and Richard L. Mayhue to produce a volume of systematic theology entitled, Biblical Doctrine: A Systematic Summary of Bible Truth.

The Master's Seminary Library
The seminary library began in 1986 with 7,000 volumes. The collection has been built into a major biblical and theological studies collection of over 350,000 volumes. The library collection is available online through the Voyager and Primo Systems of Ex Libris.  The library provides access to a wide variety of research databases including ATLA,  Thesaurus Linguae Graecae (TLG)], Early American Imprints, Ad Fontes Library of Classic Protestant Texts, and others. The Master's Seminary library was one of the founding libraries of the Southern California Theological Library Association (SCATLA).

The Master's Seminary Journal
Begun in 1990, The Master's Seminary Journal  is a publication of the faculty of The Master's Seminary. It is published semi-annually and contains articles dealing with the Biblical text, theology, and issues related to pastoral ministry. It also contains reviews of current books and significant articles relating to these issues. The Master's Seminary Journal (MSJ) is indexed and abstracted in all of the leading research tools including: Elenchus Bibliographicus Biblicus of Biblica, Christian Periodical Index, Guide to Social Science & Religion in Periodical Literature, New Testament Abstracts, Old Testament Abstracts. It is also indexed in the ATLA (American Theological Library Association) Religion Database and it is also included in the full-text ATLASerials.

Distinguished Scholars Lecture Series

Since 1990 the seminary has hosted their Distinguished Scholars Lecture Series, a course taught by a visiting professor noted for expertise in a particular field of biblical or theological studies. Notable lectures include:

 1991  Homer A. Kent, "Exposition of Acts"
 1992  Robert L. Saucy, "Dispensational Theology"
 1993  Kenneth L. Barker, "Scope of OT Theology as Fulfilled in Christ's First and Second Advents"
 1997  Walter C. Kaiser Jr., "Old Testament Ethics"
 1998  George W. Knight III, "Studies in the Pastoral Epistles"
 1999  John Feinberg, "Continuity and Discontinuity Between the Testaments
 2001  Eugene H. Merrill, "Theology of the Pentateuch"
 2002  Harold Hoehner, "Exposition of Ephesians"
 2003  Wayne Grudem, "Biblical Manhood and Womanhood"
 2005  R. Kent Hughes, "Paul's Concept of Ministry in Second Corinthians"
 2007  John D. Hannah, "Life of Jonathan Edwards"
 2008  Douglas J. Moo, "Exposition of James"
 2009  Daniel I. Block, "Worship in the Old Testament"
 2010  Bruce A. Ware, "Universal Reign of the Triune God"
 2012  John Feinberg, "Issues in Christian Ethics"
 2017  Carl Trueman, "Martin Luther and the Protestant Reformation"
 2018  Thomas R. Schreiner, "Introduction to Biblical Theology"

Notable alumni 

 Francis Chan, founder of the evangelical megachurch Cornerstone Community Church in Simi Valley, California
 Scott Seely, bishop suffragan of the Anglican Diocese of All Nations

Notable faculty 
 F. David Farnell
 John F. MacArthur
 William Varner

Related ministries
 The Master's University
 Grace Community Church

References

External links

Seminaries and theological colleges in California
Educational institutions established in 1986
Universities and colleges in the San Fernando Valley
1986 establishments in California